Juha Soukiala (born 12 February 1983 in Espoo) is a Finnish football goalkeeper. Soukiala currently plays for PK-35 in the second highest Finnish league, Ykkönen. He has also represented Tampere United, FC Hämeenlinna, and FC Lahti on a senior level.

References

1983 births
Living people
Finnish footballers
Association football goalkeepers
FC Hämeenlinna players
Tampere United players
Footballers from Espoo